Leona Lásková (born 7 April 1970) is a Czech former professional tennis player.

Biography
Lásková reached top rankings on the professional tour of 122 in singles and 93 in doubles. 

On the WTA Tour, Lásková's best singles performance came at Athens in 1988, when she made it through to the semi-finals, beating second seed Judith Wiesner en route. Her only WTA Tour final came in doubles and was also in Athens, partnering with Jana Pospíšilová to a runner-up finish in 1990.

At grand slam level she twice featured in the main draw of the French Open women's singles and also played in the doubles main draws at Wimbledon and the US Open.

Retiring from the tour in 1995, Lásková is now a tennis trainer at TK Sparta Prague.

WTA Tour finals

Doubles (0–1)

ITF finals

Singles (3–1)

Doubles (1–0)

References

External links
 
 

1970 births
Living people
Czech female tennis players
Czechoslovak female tennis players